Wyatt Tate Brady (January 20, 1870 – August 29, 1925) was an American merchant, politician, former Ku Klux Klan member, and a founder of Tulsa, Oklahoma.

Early life
Brady was born in Forest City, Missouri, in 1870. 
His family moved to Nevada, Missouri when he was 12, where he eventually took a job at a shoe store. 
Here, he was the victim of a robbery. 
In 1890, at the age of 20, Brady arrived in present-day Tulsa, Oklahoma. In 1895, Brady married Rachel Davis, who was a member of a prominent Cherokee family. After the marriage, Brady was adopted into the Cherokee tribe and became a strong advocate for their tribal claims against Washington.
Together they had two daughters and three sons.

Career

Founding Tulsa
In 1896, Brady and other prominent businessmen  signed the charter to officially incorporate Tulsa in Indian Territory. Following the 1901 discovery of the Red Fork oil field, Brady began construction on the Brady Hotel in 1902. The hotel opened in 1903, taking advantage of the oil boom by providing a hotel for oil executives. The 1905 discovery of the Glenn Pool further boosted the hotels popularity. It also served as a meeting ground for the  Democratic Party.

In March 1905, Brady traveled the country on a train with about 100 civic leaders, a band, and Will Rogers to promote the Tulsa.

State politics
After statehood, he was named to the Democratic National Committee in 1907. He supported many early Governors such as Charles N. Haskell and Robert L. Williams.

Tulsa Outrage

In the lead up to the Tulsa Outrage, Brady served as a member of the Tulsa Home Guard. On November 6, 1917, Brady physically assaulted the owner of the Hotel Fox, E. L. Fox, for renting to the Industrial Workers of the World. Brady is believed to have led a Knights of Liberty attack against IWW members during on November 9, 1917.

Tulsa race massacre of 1921

Brady served as a night watchman during the 1921 Tulsa race massacre. He reportedly witnessed "five dead negroes" with one being dragged behind an automobile, with a rope about his neck, throughout the business district. After the massacre, Brady was appointed to the Tulsa Real Estate Exchange Commission which was tasked with assessing the property damage from the massacre. The commission planned to expand railroads in the are to segregate white and black parts of town writing "We further believe that the two races being divided by an industrial section will draw more distinctive lines between them and thereby eliminate the intermingling of the lower elements of the two races.” The commissions plans were halted by the Supreme Court of Oklahoma.

Ku Klux Klan activities
In 1918, Brady helped bring the Sons of Confederate Veterans 28th Annual Reunion to Tulsa, with Nathan Bedford Forrest II serving as the keynote speaker.

In 1923, the Klan, established as the Tulsa Benevolent Society, paid $200,000 for the construction of a large "Klavern" or gathering hall that could seat 3,000 members. It was finished as Beno Hall on land owned by Brady.

At a 1923 military tribunal, Brady stated that he, like his father before him, had been a member of the Klan but he had quit the Klan in 1922.

Death
Brady died by suicide on August 29, 1925, by shooting himself in the temple. He was said to be despondent over the death of his son, John Davis Brady, who was killed in a car accident in the spring of 1925 while studying law at the University of Virginia.

Legacy

Eponym
Brady was commemorated for his part in the founding of Tulsa with numerous locations named after him in Tulsa including: Brady Hotel (demolished 1975), Brady Street (renamed M. B. Brady Street in 2013 and Reconciliation Way in 2019), Brady Heights (renamed The Heights in 2021), Brady Theatre (renamed Tulsa Theater in 2019), Brady Mansion (renamed Skyline Mansion in 2016), and the Brady Arts District (renamed Tulsa Arts District in 2017).

In 1975, the Brady Hotel was demolished after a fire.

A controversy arose in 2013 over the appropriateness of naming a street for Brady, because of his membership in the Klan. On August 15, 2013,  the Tulsa City Council voted 7–1 to change Brady Street to MB Brady Street to honor Mathew B. Brady, a famed Civil War photographer. M. B. Brady had no ties to Tulsa or Oklahoma. They also voted to add honorary signs that read "Reconciliation Way" around the Inner Dispersal Loop.

Brady built a mansion known as "Arlington" that was patterned after the ancestral home of the Lee family in Virginia. It later became known as Brady Mansion. The mansion was bought by former NFL first-round draft pick and Tulsa native, Felix Jones, in 2016 and is now known as Skyline Mansion. It can be seen on the cover of Fire in Little Africa, a groundbreaking album released in May 2021 on Motown's sub-label Black Forum. The album consists of original material that was written and recorded by a collective of Oklahoma hip hop artists to commemorate the 100th anniversary of the Tulsa race massacre, which W. Tate Brady took part in organizing, and was recorded over a five-day period in March 2020. Studios were set up at the Greenwood Cultural Center and at the Skyline Mansion.

In September 2017, the Brady Arts District Business Association voted to change the name of the district, north of downtown, to the Tulsa Arts District in order to sever ties completely with the street's original namesake. 

In 2018, the Tulsa City Council voted  to rename "Mathew Brady Street" to "Reconciliation Way". On December 6, 2018, the Brady Theater (formerly Tulsa Convention Hall and Tulsa Municipal Theater) announced that it is changing its name to The Tulsa Theater in 2019.

In September 2021, Brady Heights voted to rename itself "The Heights."

Monuments
Tate Brady formerly had a star bearing his name outside the Cain's Ballroom (Brady had the original building built as a garage) until 2020 when the owners had the star removed.

References

1870 births
1925 deaths
American Ku Klux Klan members
Politicians from Tulsa, Oklahoma
American politicians who committed suicide
Suicides by firearm in Oklahoma
People from Holt County, Missouri
Oklahoma Democrats
People from Nevada, Missouri
Tarring and feathering in the United States
1925 suicides